I ♡ Natural is Korean pop singer Lee Jung-hyun's fourth album, released in 2002.

Production

Concept art
The album had a "wild girl" theme that some described as a "stone-age nature loving lady" and costumes that broke norms at the time to depict a "wolf girl" persona were worn during the performances.

Song descriptions
Lot of attempts to fuse traditional Korean songs and technos were made in the album.The main single "Ari Ari" was inspired from the choruses of the Korean traditional song Arirang.Danshimga is a recitation of a sijo by Jeong Mongju, set to the sound of techno beats.

Track listing
 단심가 - Danshimga
 달아달아 - Dara Dara (Run Away)
 Q
 Tell Me
Time machine
고향의 봄(interlude feat.박주아)
Brighter than  Sunshine
 Rhythm Nature (Interlude) Featuring: 두드락
 아리아리 - Ari Ari
 뭘더 바래? - What Do You Want?
 미워요 - I Hate You
 날봐 - Look At Me
 Believe
 Sun Flower
 To Be Continued

Notes

References

2002 albums
Lee Jung-hyun albums